Acanthocephalus dirus is a species of parasitic worm in the Echinorhynchidae family.  Instead of having its eggs expelled from the host in feces, the gravid female detaches itself from the host's digestive tract and sinks to the bottom, where her body is consumed by the species' intermediate host, Caecidotea intermedius, a species of isopod.  Upon hatching, the larvae begin to alter their host's behavior. This will manifest in lighter pigmentation and an increased attraction to predators, such as A. dirus''' primary hosts.


HostsAcanthocephalus dirus'' is commonly found parasitizing the following species of fish:

References

Notes

Further reading

External links

Echinorhynchidae
Suicide-inducing parasitism
Animals described in 1931